Rob Curry is a British film director, best known for his work on theatrical documentaries. His films include TEMPEST (released in UK cinemas in 2012), and Way of the Morris (co-directed with Tim Plester), which premiered at SXSW and was released in the UK in 2011.

Filmography

Features:

2020 Southern Journey (Revisited) (documentary)

2019  The Chills: The Triumph and the Tragedy of Martin Phillips (documentary)

2017 The Ballad of Shirley Collins (documentary)

2012 Tempest (documentary)

2011 Way of the Morris (documentary)

2007 The Boat People (fiction)

External links

http://www.balladofshirleycollins.com/
http://www.wayofthemorris.com/

References

Living people
British film directors
Year of birth missing (living people)